Louis Carbonel (born 4 February 1999) is a French rugby union player. His position is fly-half and he currently plays for Montpellier in the Top 14.

International honours

France (U20)
Six Nations Under 20s Championship winners: 2018
World Rugby Under 20 Championship winners (2): 2018, 2019

References

External links
France profile at FFR
Toulon profile
L'Équipe profile

1999 births
Living people
Sportspeople from Toulon
French rugby union players
RC Toulonnais players
Montpellier Hérault Rugby players
Rugby union fly-halves
France international rugby union players